Sweet 19 Blues (stylized SWEET 19 BLUES) is the second studio album by Japanese recording artist Namie Amuro. The album was released in four different slipcases, with the first three cases limited to 1,000,000 copies each—were put on sale on July 20, 1996, throughout Japan, and
were distributed two days later to the rest of Asia by Avex Trax. The album was primarily handled by Japanese producer Tetsuya Komuro, with the assistance of Cozy Kubo, Akio Togashi, Takahiro Maeda, M.C.A.T. and Randy Waldman, it is her debut solo album to date since the spilt of Super Monkey's.

Sweet 19 Blues is a departure from the singer's debut album Dance Tracks Vol. 1 (1995), having been influenced by various dance genres and styles such as acid house, funk, jazz and R&B to name a few. Alongside a selection of newly recorded songs, the album also holds a number of interludes and re-worked material, alongside remixes of each single. Lyrically, the album's central focus is about adolescence, which is loosely derived on the record's title, and discusses about prior relationships, family, and other activities in Amuro's personal life.

The album receive commercial success and received critical acclaimed by their reviews had drawn Amuro numerous awards and accolades, including the prestigious Best Album achievement at the Japan Record Awards. Commercially, the album was a success in Japan, debuting atop of the Oricon Albums Chart, and has sold under four million units. Achieving the highest first week sales for a solo female artist, the album was once the best-selling studio album in Japanese music history, until it was surpassed by future titles by other artists.

To promote the Sweet 19 Blues, Amuro and Avex released five singles; "Body Feels Exit", "Chase the Chance", "Don't Wanna Cry", "You're My Sunshine" and the title track, all resulting into commercial success. To follow-up on the album's success, Amuro conducted a nationwide tour that celebrated her first anniversary as a solo artist, travelling through her native Okinawa and Chiba Prefecture; a live release was distributed in December 1996. In retrospect, Sweet 19 Blues has been cited as an emblematic musical release to Japan, and Amuro's appearance and fashion style, at that time, was noted as a significant trend throughout the Japanese public.

Background and development
Okinawan-native Amuro had moved to Tokyo, Japan in order to pursue a music career; there, she was the lead singer to the idol group Super Monkey's, along with five other girls: Anna Makino, Hisako Arakaki, Nanako Takushi, and Minako Ameku. After a string of unsuccessful hits, the four latter members decided to reform a sub-group without Amuro named MAX, signed under the Japanese record label Avex Trax. As a result, Amuro released two more solo singles with Toshiba-EMI, and moved to Avex Trax herself. In mid-1995, Avex hired Japanese producer and Globe member Tetsuya Komuro to work with the singer on her solo debut; co-producers Cozy Kubo and executive Max Matsuura assisted the two performers. This was Matsuura's second time working with Amuro, whom crafted majority of the content—alongside remixing additional tracks—on the singer's debut album, Dance Tracks Vol. 1 (1995). Between 1995–96, Komuro was in the process of producing Globe's first record self-titled album, and Matsuura had continued scoping more younger and upcoming music artists; this resulted into limited studio sessions with Amuro. Sweet 19 Blues was recorded through various studios in Japan, such as Avex Studios and Prime Studios, and additionally recorded vocals in Los Angeles, California and New York City, New York. By the second quarter of 1996, the material from Sweet 19 Blues was mixed and mastered by Avaco Creative Studios and Sounds Inc Studios.

Composition

Sweet 19 Blues was primarily handled by Japanese producer Tetsuya Komuro—whom had helped Amuro with her early work when she was with Super Monkey's, and with her early solo work—with the assistance of Cozy Kubo, Akio Togashi, Takahiro Maeda, m.c.A.T and Randy Waldman. Musically, it is a departure from Dance Tracks Vol. 1 (1995), having been influenced by various dance genres and styles such as 1970s–1980s acid house, funk, jazz and R&B. Stylistically, a member from American publication AllMusic wrote that it was a "highly polished dance-pop sound characterized by disco rhythms and funky basslines." At the time of Amuro's debut, the eurobeat genre was heavy with the Japanese music industry, which resulted in the genre being a blueprint to Dance Tracks Vol. 1. This was also noted by critics as a parallel difference between Amuro's debut and Komuro's sound with Globe.

There are 11 full-length recorded songs on the album, all which features vocals from both Amuro and various backing singers and choir members. The singles—"Body Feels Exit", "Don't Wanna Cry", "Chase the Chance", "You're My Sunshine" and the title track—were all remixed by Komuro, removing their original J-pop and eurobeat sound, in favour for "sophisticat[ed]" and "mature" compositions. Additionally, there are eight interludes, one which is an orchestral re-worked version of "Don't Wanna Cry". Through majority of the record, Amuro sings in both English and Japanese, though her inclusion with the former language was assisted by the backing singers; this reflected on the tracks "Let's Do the Motion", "Private", "Rainy Dance", "I'll Jump", "I Was a Fool", "Present" and the title track. The song "Joy", which features vocals by M.C.A.T., is in fact a shortened version to what appears on the CD single of "Sweet 19 Blues"; two additional remixes appeared on it, whilst an original mix was featured on his single "Thunder Party".

The material on Sweet 19 Blues were written by Komuro, with the assistance of Takahiro Maeda, at Komuro's request. Lyrically, the album's central focus is about adolescence, which is loosely derived on the record's title track and interlude "...soon nineteen". Some of the album's lyrical material surrounds Amuro's personal life, such as past relationships, friendships and family ("Present", "Don't Wanna Cry", and "I Was a Fool"). Moreover, Amuro's personal aspirations and dreams of becoming a recording artist was reflected onto "Chase the Chance", whereas Maeda incorporated references from politics around the world, and created metaphorical deliveries for the dance-anthem "Let's Do the Motion". Other entries deliver obscure stories from the singer's past; on "Rainy Dance", Amuro sings about her enjoyment of the rain and not allowing obstacles to ruin her day. "Private" was one of the first tracks recorded for the album, but had to be re-worked by Maeda as Komuro felt her deliveries were insufficient; Maeda had written rapping sequences for Amuro to sing, and described the process as more of a "short story" than songwriting.

Release
The first-press editions of Sweet 19 Blues were made available in selected stores in Japan on July 20, 1996. Two days later, Avex Trax had distributed the record throughout Japan, housed in four different card sleeves. For each sleeve, one million copies were printed by Avex, and all designate an original artwork; the inner booklet of the jewelcase features a black-and-white still of Amuro, sitting on an arm chair with a camera by her side. The photographs of the album shoot were taken by Itaru Hirama, while the design of its booklet was produced by Tycoon Graphics in Tokyo, Japan. In August that year, the record was distributed to the Taiwanese market, and furthermore in Hong Kong in mid-October 1996. To celebrate the singer's 20th music anniversary, Sweet 19 Blues was re-issued in Japan at a special limited-low price deal. According to Ted Mills from AllMusic, the title of the album was a reflection of a "melancholic passing of another sweet year of youth", which he described as a "particular Japanese obsession".

Promotion

Singles
The first single from Sweet 19 Blues was "Body Feels Exit", which also served as Amuro's first release after signing to Avex Trax. Released on October 25, 1995, it became a huge success in Japan, peaking at number three on the Oricon Singles Chart, and earned a double Platinum certification for selling over 881,000 units in that region. The second single, "Chase the Chance", became her first number single on the Oricon Singles Chart, and her first to sell over one million copies in the country. After a brief hiatus, Amuro released two more singles in 1996: "Don't Wanna Cry" and "You're My Sunshine". The former track spent a total of three weeks at number one on the Oricon Singles Chart, whereas the latter spent two weeks there. Both singles were successful in Japan, bringing her second and third consecutive number one singles, and both sold over one million units there. She released the album's final single, the title track, on August 21, 1996. It achieved success by peaking at number two on the Oricon Singles Chart, but was her first single to sell under 500,000 units in the country.

Many songs from Sweet 19 Blues were used as promotional recordings to commercial endorsements throughout Japan, and to simply promote the record itself. The first out of the bunch was "Let's Do the Motion", which was used as the theme song to a special Avex Trax commercial to promote the album. A remix to "Private"—the fourth track on the album—was used in four different campaigns for Nissan cars; each advert featured Amuro. "I'll Jump" and the original mix of "Don't Wanna Cry" were used in the commercial for DyDo Mistio Soft drinks, which had Amuro consuming the drink. The final album track taken as a theme song was a short snippet of "Joy", which was placed in the commercial for the Maxell product UD2.

Concert tour
In order to promote the album, Amuro conducted a special concert tour that also celebrated her first anniversary as a solo singer. She visited the Ginowan Seaside Park Outdoor Theater in her native Okinawa, and performed two concerts on August 27–28, 1996. Three days later, she travelled to the Chiba Prefecture to perform a setlist of songs at the Chiba Marine Stadium. Amuro performed majority of the material off Sweet 19 Blues, alongside some tracks from her work with Super Monkeys—the band had re-united on September 1 to perform a bunch of tracks with the singer. That same day, her performance was recorded live by Japanese director Kenji Sano, and printed onto VHS on December 4, 1996 in Japan. Four years later, the VHS was converted into a limited edition DVD format, and printed in Japan only. Avex Trax had re-issued the DVD format for special limited-edition prices in 2005, and again in 2012 for her 20th anniversary.

Critical reception

Sweet 19 Blues received acclaim from music critics. Ted Mills from AllMusic awarded the record three-and-a-half stars out of five, praising producer Tetsuya Komuro's input on the remixes and musical expansions on a "brilliantly produced pop album,". Mills emphasized that Komuro's intention to remix majority of the content "came as a shock" to the Japanese public, but new additions such as "I'll Jump" and "I Was a Fool". Despite having ambivalent views on Amuro's "limit[ed]" vocal abilities, he concluded that "Listenable, and danceable, from beginning to end, any 19-year-old pop wunderkind couldn't ask for anything more... and secured a place in J-Pop history." Minoru Majin of Amazon.com highlighted the album's R&B quality as a successful factor to its release, and, once again, complimented Komuro's involvement. Writing for CD Journal, a staff member felt the "surreal" and "poet[ic]" songwriting and Amuro's image shift from a typical Japanese idol, was a successful turn in her career.

Commercially, Sweet 19 Blues was a massive success in Japan. It opened at number one on the Oricon Albums Chart, selling a record-breaking 1.921 million copies in its first week of release, the highest achievement by any group or solo artist in Japan at the time. She was also the first female music artist to achieve the highest first week sales. According to various published sources and journalists, the album, in total, sold three million units in its first week throughout Asia, one of the biggest first week accumulations by any Asian artist. It retained its position at number one the following week, but sold 352,950 copies, and fell to number four in its third week with sales of 196,240 units. The album spent a further 39 more weeks on the top 100, and at the end of 1996, it was ranked the second highest-selling album of the year, just behind Globe's self-titled release. It was certified triple million by the Recording Industry Association of Japan, with shipments of three million copies.

In September 2017, Namie Amuro announced her retirement from the music industry. Because of this, her music catalogue skyrocketed on several digital stores; Sweet 19 Blues was included, and debuted at number 13 on the Oricon Digital Albums Chart with sales of 766 copies.

Impact and legacy

Sweet 19 Blues remains Amuro's best-selling studio album, and overall work of her career. For a brief period in 1996, Sweet 19 Blues was the best-selling album in Japanese music history, until it was surpassed that same year by Globe's self-titled release—which became the first record to achieve over the four million sales mark. Additionally, Sweet 19 Blues was the highest-selling release for a solo and female artist, until it was challenged by Hikaru Utada's 1999 studio album First Love, which to this day stands as the best-selling album in Japan. By the end of the 1990s, it sold over 3.359 million copies in Japan alone; as of today, it has achieved under four million sales in that region. Additionally, Amuro was the only artist in 1996 to have the most million-selling singles from a single album, with a total of three ("Chase the Chance", "Don't Wanna Cry", and "You're My Sunshine"). In an article written for Billboard magazine, the Recording Industry Association of Japan (RIAJ) confirmed that Amuro—alongside the "Komuro family", consisting of Amuro, Komuro, Globe Tomomi Kahara, and TRF—were the most "dominating" figures in the Japanese industry and music economy at the time, and resulted into higher sales percentages from the previous year. That same year, the magazine hosted an article that was dedicated towards Komuro, and exemplified Amuro's single "Don't Wanna Cry" as a "good example of Komuro's good school of pop production,".

As a result to the album's success in the 1990s, Amuro was noted by journalists and commentators as a trendsetter to the Japanese public, where her fandom were dubbed "Amura". She became a lot more prominent in fashion magazines, and the general press, for the typical Japanese idol departure, in favour of "dyeing their hair brown, plucking their eyebrows... High heels, a miniskirt, and tattoos,". Because of this, critics noticed that she stood out from her contemporaries, and other idol singers. However, David W. Edgington—writer of the novel Japan at the Millennium: Joining Past and Future—opined that Amuro had changed the stereotypical idol culture, whereas writer Marwan Kraidy believed she was part of "Japan's rising cultural power" towards the world. Furthermore, an author from the U.S.-Japan Women's Centre believed the singer's success of Sweet 19 Blues was the reason many people emulated her as a role model between 1996 and 1997. Evidently, some commentators described her sudden rise in success to the experiences of Janet Jackson and Madonna, two artists that catapulted into stardom at a young age. These two artists, in particular, inspired Western media to dub Amuro with honorific titles such as the "Queen of Japanese Pop" or "Japanese Madonna".

The album's success also awarded Amuro with numerous accolades and recognition. At the 38th Japan Record Awards, Amuro won the Grand Prix award—the highest honour of the ceremony—for her single "Don't Wanna Cry"; she was the youngest artist to be awarded this accolade. Additionally, she received the Excellence award for the single, and a Best Album achievement for Sweet 19 Blues. At the 11th Japan Gold Disc Awards ceremony, Amuro was recognized as their top-selling and earning artist; she was also selected as the top five artists of the year. "Don't Wanna Cry" was chosen as one of the five best singles of 1996, and the singer's DVD "First Anniversary at Marine Stadium" was the voted the best music video. Furthermore, Amuro was given the Music Award at the 33rd Golden Arrow Awards, the Best Idol Performer at the 1st annual Idol Awards, and the Best Dresser statue for the female category. In 2015, Japanese website Goo conducted a survey to find out which amongst Amuro's albums was viewed her best by the Japanese public; with over 1,600 votes in total, Sweet 19 Blue ranked first place.

Track listing
Credits adapted from Oricon.

Credits and personnel
Credits adapted from the CD liner notes of Sweet 19 Blues.

Recording and management
Recorded and mixed between 1995–1996 at TK Sequence Studios, Woodstock Karuizawa Studios, Artworks Studio, Baybridge Studio, Heart Beat Recording Studio, Image Recording Inc., Paradise Studio Komazawa, Prime-Mix Studio, Onkio Haus (Tokyo, Japan); Record Plant Studios, Sound Chamber (Los Angeles, California, New York City, New York).

Personnel

 Namie Amuro – vocals, background vocals
 m.c.A.T – vocals
 Sheila E. – backing vocals, percussion
 Joey Johnson – backing vocals
 Lynn Mabry – background vocals
 Ricky Nelson – background vocals
 Tracey Whitney – background vocals
 Valerie Williams – background vocals
 Kinbara Chieko – strings
 Cozy Kubo – producer, keyboard, synthesizer
 Tetsuya Komuro – producer, backing vocals, keyboard, synthesizer
 Kazuhiro Matsuo – guitar
 Tatsuya Murayama – strings
 Raphael Padilla – percussions
 Michael Paulo – saxophone
 Neil Stubenhaus – bass guitar
 Michael Thompson – guitar
 Keith Cohen – arranger, mixing
 Akihiko Shimizu – vocal director
 Itaru Hirama – photographer
 Tycoon Graphics – art direction

Charts

Weekly chart

Year-end charts

Certifications and sales

Notes

References

See also 
 Sweet 19 Blues at Namie Amuro's official website. 

Namie Amuro albums
1996 albums
Avex Group albums
Albums produced by Tetsuya Komuro